The Mond Nickel Company Limited was a United Kingdom-based mining company, formed on September 20, 1900, licensed in Canada to carry on business in the province of Ontario, from October 16, 1900. The firm was founded by Ludwig Mond (1839-1909) to process Canadian ore from mines near Sudbury, which were then shipped to Mond's works in Britain for final purification via his patented carbonyl process.

The first of Mond's Canadian mining properties located in Denison Township, was purchased from Rinaldo McConnell and associates in 1899. this site renamed the Victoria Mine began development in 1900. About the same time, Mond's refinery at Clydach, near Swansea, Wales, was being erected.

Around the same time, Mond purchased a second mining location from Rinaldo McConnell called the Garson Mine which was developed later on in Garson Township.

In 1911 the Mond company began construction of a new smelter at Coniston, Ontario. In that year, the company purchased the mining rights at Frood Extension about 8 miles from Coniston, though no serious development took place at this location until the 1920s.

By 1928 INCO began development of its Frood Mine. When it was determined that it and Mond's Frood Extension were part of the same ore body, Alfred Mond negotiated an agreement pursuant to which in 1929 the interests of the Mond Nickel Company were merged into the International Nickel Company through the issue of the latter's stock in exchange for the outstanding stock of Mond.

As one result of the merger, the Inconel trademark was created in 1932 for the output of Henry Wiggan & Co, the Mond Nickel Company's research arm in Hereford, England.

In 1936, a research facility was opened in Birmingham.

In 1961, the name of the company was changed to International Nickel Company (Mond) Ltd.

References

Defunct mining companies of Canada
Mining companies of the United Kingdom
History of Greater Sudbury
Nickel mining companies
Economy of Greater Sudbury